Elder is an American four-piece rock band from Massachusetts, consisting of frontman Nick DiSalvo, bassist Jack Donovan, guitarist/keyboardist Michael Risberg and drummer Georg Edert. They have released six full-length albums since 2006 and multiple demos and EPs.

History
Elder was formed in Massachusetts in the mid-2000s by Nick DiSalvo (guitars, vocals), Chas Mitchell (bass), and Matt Couto (drums). After releasing a split album with the psychedelic rock band Queen Elephantine in 2006, Elder released their eponymous debut LP in 2009 and Dead Roots Stirring in 2011, both on MeteorCity Records. The band signed with Stickman Records and released their third LP, Lore, in 2015.

Mike Risberg joined the band on guitars and keyboards in 2017. Co-founding member and drummer Matt Couto left the band in 2019 and was replaced by Georg Edert.

Members 
Current
Nick DiSalvo – vocals, guitar (2006–present)
Jack Donovan – bass (2008–present)
Mike Risberg – guitar, keyboards (2017–present)
Georg Edert – drums (2019–present)

Former
 Matt Couto – drums (2006–2019)
 Chas Mitchell – bass (2006–2007)

Timeline

Discography

Elder / Queen Elephantine (2006)
This split album is the first appearance of the band under the name Elder and was released in September 2006.

Track listing:
Queen Elephantine - Ramesses I 	
Queen Elephantine - Ramesses II 		
Queen Elephantine - Ramesses III 	
Queen Elephantine - Ramesses IV	
Elder - 1162
Elder - Red Sunrise
Elder - Black Midnight
Elder - Soul Incarnate

Elder (2007)
The first demo album by Elder, released in May 2007.

Track listing:
1162
Red Sunrise 		
Black Midnight

Elder (2008)

Elder's first full-length self-titled album. This album incorporates a mixture of doom metal and stoner rock elements throughout, while mainly consisting of doom metal and some low-pitched strained vocals on such songs as "Riddle of Steel Pt. 1" similar to Sleep's album Dopesmoker.

Track listing:
White Walls - 6:52
Hexe - 9:00
Riddle of Steel Pt. 1 - 10:00
Ghost Head - 7:35
Riddle of Steel Pt.2 - 8:21

Dead Roots Stirring (2011)

Elder's second album released on October 25, 2011. This album, unlike their previous album, mainly incorporates stoner rock elements and some psychedelic rock elements. Clay Neely was the sound engineer for the album, Justin Pizzoferrato mixed it, and Adrian Dexter created the album artwork.

Track listing:
Gemini - 9:40
Dead Roots Stirring - 12:00
III - 8:43
The End - 9:16
Knot - 11:56

Demos & Live (2012)
Elder's second demo album.

Track listing:
1162 		
Red Sunrise 		
Black Midnight 		
Gemini (Live) 		
Riddle of Steel (Live)

Spires Burn / Release (2012)
An extended play (EP), which was only released on vinyl and then converted to a digital format. Released on April 21, 2012.

Track listing:
Spires Burn
Release

Elder: Live at Roadburn (2013)
A live album released on November 15, consisting of six tracks from their previously released material.

Track listing:
Gemini
Dead Roots Stirring
Spires Burn
The End
Knot
Riddle of Steel Pt. 1

Lore (2015)

A full-length album released on February 27, 2015. This album featured elements reminiscent of progressive rock, as opposed to the more straight stoner rock/metal sound heard on earlier albums.

Track listing:
Compendium - 10:39
Legend - 12:31
Lore - 16:00
Deadweight - 9:28
Spirit at Aphelion - 10:32

Reflections of a Floating World (2017)

Released on June 2, 2017. Rolling Stone magazine rated it fifth on its list of the top metal albums for 2017.

Track listing:
 Sanctuary - 11:13
 The Falling Veil - 11:12
 Staving Off Truth - 10:18
 Blind - 13:23
 Sonntag - 8:39
 Thousand Hands - 9:36

The Gold & Silver Sessions (2019)

Track listing:
 Illusory Motion - 9:53
 Im Morgengrauen - 5:24
 Weißensee - 18:33

Omens (2020)

Omens was released on April 24, 2020. The title track was released as a single in February 2020.

Track listing:
 Omens - 10:53
 In Procession - 9:53
 Halcyon - 12:48
 Embers - 10:47
 One light retreating - 11:13

ELDOVAR - A Story of Darkness & Light (2021)
On December 3, 2021, Elder released a collaborative album with the German psychedelic rock band Kadavar. The collaboration was the result of tours being cancelled due to the COVID-19 pandemic and both bands residing in Berlin.

Track listing:
 From Deep Within
 In the Way
 El Matador
 Rebirth of the Twins
 Raspletin
 Blood Moon Night
 Cherry Trees

Innate Passage (2022)
Track listing:
 Catastasis - 10:50
 Endless Return - 9:54
 Coalescence - 9:47
 Merged In Dreams - Ne Plus Ultra - 14:43
 The Purpose - 8:37

References

External links
Behold the Elder (official band website)
Elder on Facebook
Elder on Bandcamp

2006 establishments in Massachusetts
American doom metal musical groups
American stoner rock musical groups
Heavy metal musical groups from Massachusetts
Musical groups established in 2006